Mellotron On! was intended to be the Primitive Radio Gods' second album, following Rocket. However, the record company that was to release the album, Sire Records, went bankrupt shortly before its release. Most of the songs on Mellotron On! ended up on the band's true second album, White Hot Peach; the remaining ones were made available over eMusic. Originally planned to be released in 1999, the Album did not see the light of day until the band made copies of it available over their website in 2003.

Track listing
 "Comrade Lovers"1, as "Motor of Joy"
 "Gotta Know Now"2
 "Fading Out" (acoustic)3
 "Black Is the Color"4, as "Meadowlark, I Found Your Dog"
 "Ghost of a Chance"2
 "Stereo Winter"3
 "2 Lice in the Blonde Hair of Nothing"3
 "Wayward Pilot's Mission"1
 "Message from Steven"1
 "Blood from a Beating Heart"2
 "Future Followers of Erika"3
 "1st Alien Photo"2
 "You Are the Dreamer"4
 "Fading Out #2 (Remix & Reprise)"5
("Devil's Triangle"2 is included as a bonus song after at the end of track 14)

Footnotes
1 Present on White Hot Peach, but is extended/mixed differently on Mellotron On!
2 Present on White Hot Peach, and is (nearly) identical to the Mellotron On! mix
3 Not present on White Hot Peach, but can be found on the Umpteen Spooks eMusic collection
4 Not present on White Hot Peach, but can be found on the Additional B-Sides eMusic collection
5 Exclusive to Mellotron On!

Primitive Radio Gods albums
2003 compilation albums
Self-released albums